Jaime Claire Bourbonnais (born September 9, 1998) is a Canadian women's ice hockey defender, currently playing for the Montréal section of the PWHPA.

She made her debut for the Canada women's national ice hockey team at the 2018 4 Nations Cup.

Playing career
Participated with Team Ontario at the 2015 Canada Winter Games, in Prince George, British Columbia

Participated in The National Women's Under-18 Championship winning Gold, where she was named the top defenseman.

Hockey Canada
With Canada's Under-22/Development Team, Bourbonnais captured a Silver medal at the 2017 Nations Cup.

NCAA
During her freshman season with the Cornell Big Red, Bourbonnais finishing tied for third on the team in points with 16. She finished the season selected for ECAC Hockey All-Rookie Team as well as a Honorable Mention All-Ivy.

After her sophomore season, Bourbonnais was selected for the Second Team All-ECAC and First Team All-Ivy. She was also awarded Cornell's Tompkins Girls Hockey Association Cub Club Mentor honor.

Bourbonnais finished her junior season second in the nation for points amongst defensemen and fourth in the nation for assists and goals per game. After the 2018–19 season, Bourbonnais was awarded ECAC Best Defenseman after she recorded 29 points and led the team in Plus/Minus. She was also named to the First Team All-ECAC.

Career statistics

Hockey Canada

NCAA

Awards and honours
2017 All-Ivy Honorable Mention
2017 ECAC All-Rookie Team
2018 First Team All-Ivy
2018 ECAC Second Team All-Star
2019 First Team All-Ivy
2019 ECAC First Team All-Star
2019 ECAC Top Defenceman
2019 All-American Second Team
2019 All-USCHO First Team
2020 CCM/AHCA First-Team All-America
2020 First-Team All-USCHO
2020 Patty Kazmaier Award Top-10 Finalist
2020 ECAC Hockey Best Defenseman
2020 First-Team All-ECAC Hockey
2020 First-Team All-Ivy League
2020 Charles H. Moore Outstanding Senior Varsity Athlete

Personal
Her grandfather, Roger Bourbonnais, also competed for Team Canada and was inducted into the IIHF Hall of Fame.

References

External links

1998 births
Living people
Canadian expatriate ice hockey players in the United States
Canadian women's ice hockey defencemen
Cornell Big Red women's ice hockey players
Ice hockey people from Ontario
Sportspeople from Mississauga
Professional Women's Hockey Players Association players